T23 may refer to:

Aviation 
 Aerotec T-23, a Brazilian military trainer
 Albany Municipal Airport (Texas), in Shackelford County, Texas, United States
 Junkers T 23, a German experimental trainer
 Slingsby T.23 Kite 1A, a British glider

Rail and transit

Rolling stock 
 SJ T23, a Swedish locomotive
 WEG T 23, a German railbus

Stations 
 Nishi-Funabashi Station, in Funabashi, Chiba, Japan
 Tanimachi Yonchōme Station, in Chūō-ku, Osaka, Japan
 Yashima Station (Kagawa), in Takamatsu, Kagawa, Japan

Ships and boats 
 Columbia T-23, an American sailboat

Other uses 
 Cooper T23, a British racing car
 T23 Medium Tank, an American prototype tank
 T-23 Tankette, a Soviet tank
 ThinkPad T23, a notebook computer